René Obst (born 21 June 1977) is a German former professional racing cyclist. He notably won the GP Stad Zottegem in 2006.

Major results

2000
 2nd Rund um Berlin
2001
 1st Stages 5 & 7 Tour of South China Sea
 1st Stage 7 Vuelta a la Independencia Nacional
2002
 1st Stages 5 & 6 Tour of South China Sea
 1st Stage 3 Tour de Gironde
 1st Stage 5 Brandenburg-Rundfahrt
 5th Ronde van Overijssel
 8th Grand Prix de Beuvry-la-Forêt
2003
 1st Stage 3 Brandenburg-Rundfahrt
 5th Poreč Trophy 2
2006
 1st GP Stad Zottegem
 8th Overall OZ Wielerweekend
1st Stage 3
2007
 5th Grand Prix Herning
 6th Rund um den Sachsenring
 7th Rund um Köln
 7th GP Aarhus
 9th Grote Prijs Jef Scherens
2008
 1st Stage 10 Vuelta a Cuba
 10th Neuseen Classics
2009
 1st Rund um Sebnitz
 3rd Rund um den Sachsenring
2010
 1st Stage 3 Czech Cycling Tour

References

External links

1977 births
Living people
German male cyclists
People from Görlitz
Cyclists from Saxony